Racing Engineering is a Spanish racing team founded in 1999 by Alfonso de Orléans-Borbón that currently competes in the NASCAR Whelen Euro Series. The team's headquarters are located in Sanlúcar de Barrameda, near Jerez, where all car preparation and race team organization is based. The team has won 12 championship in many categories including Spanish Formula 3, World Series by Nissan, and GP2 Series.

Notable former Racing Engineering drivers include Sebastian Vettel, Lucas di Grassi, Alexander Rossi and Justin Wilson.

History
In 2000, Racing Engineering was the first Spanish team to participate in the 24 Hours of Le Mans, doing so in the GT Class with a Porsche 911 GT3-R.

In ten years of history, the team has won eleven championship titles, which is a record for any motor racing team in such a brief period of time.

Racing Engineering has participated in categories such as the Spanish GT Championship, Spanish Formula Three, in which Racing Engineering won all six consecutive championships in which it participated, World Series by Nissan and more recently, in the GP2 Series, the main feeder championship for Formula 1.

Racing Engineering participated in the Spanish Formula Three championship between 2001 and 2006 and were team champions in each of those years. The team featured names such as Nicolas Prost, Sebastian Vettel, Sébastien Buemi, Ricardo Mauricio, Álvaro Parente and Miguel Molina among their drivers. They also achieved the drivers’ title with Ander Vilariño in 2001, Ricardo Mauricio in 2003 and Borja Garcia in 2004.

The team also participated in the World Series by Nissan in 2002 and 2003. Winning the team championship in 2002 and were vice-champions in 2003.

In 2005 Racing Engineering embarked in a new adventure and joined the newly created GP2 Series. Since 2007, all efforts of the Spanish team are solely focused on this championship.

In 2005 Racing Engineering featured the Swiss Neel Jani and the recently crowned Spanish Formula 3 champion Borja Garcia. The team finished the season fifth in the teams’ championship.

For 2006, Racing Engineering signed Briton Adam Carroll and the young Spanish Javier Villa. The team finished the year in seventh position.

In 2007, Racing Engineering continued its GP2 participation with the young Javier Villa, who once more was the youngest driver in the field. The Spaniard celebrated three victories in the Racing Engineering car.

For the 2008 season, the drivers were Javier Villa, in his third season in the championship with the team, and Giorgio Pantano, another veteran. Pantano celebrated an amazing season and claimed the drivers' title, whilst the team finished in fourth position.

 For the 2009 season, Racing Engineering signed the young Spaniard Dani Clos for his debut in the category and Brazilian Lucas di Grassi, who was also the third driver for the Renault F1 Team. The Spanish rookie achieved his first podium at the Portimao round, whilst Di Grassi was third in the championship and, for the 2010 season, graduated to F1.

For the 2010 season Dani Clos continued with the team. Whilst continuing with their policy of having an experienced driver and giving a chance to a rookie, Racing Engineering signed the German newcomer Christian Vietoris, vice-champion of the 2009 F3 Euroseries. Dani Clos has been in the fight for the drivers’ championship right up until the penultimate round, having achieved pole position in Monaco and having won the sprint race in Istanbul, as well as finishing on the podium several times during the season. 
Christian Vietoris achieved his first win in the championship during the sprint race in Monza after a rocket start. For the last round in Abu Dhabi, Vietoris suffered an appendicitis at the last minute, with Racing engineering being able to secure Ho-Pin Tung as a replacement just in time for the practice session. Dani Clos ended the season just one point shy of being third in the championship, whilst Racing Engineering finished the season in fourth position in the teams' table.

For the 2011 GP2 season, Racing Engineering competed in the Asia Series for the first time, with Nathanaël Berthon joining Clos on the driving strength. Clos took victory in the final race of the truncated season, elevating the team to ninth in the championship. Vietoris returned for the main series, replacing Berthon, but was then injured and sat out four races, for which he was replaced by Álvaro Parente. After Vietoris' return, he won two races and finished ninth in the drivers' championship, ahead of Clos (ninth) and Parente (16th), who also raced for the Carlin team later in the year. Racing Engineering finished a career-best third in the teams' championship, behind Addax and DAMS.

In 2012, Racing Engineering signed Fabio Leimer and rookie Nathanaël Berthon for the 2012 season, the Asia Series having been discontinued. Leimer finished seventh in the drivers' championship with six podium finishes, a pole position and two fastest laps; Berthon was twelfth with two second-placed finishes. The team manage to get to fourth place in the teams' championship.

In 2013 Racing Engineering finished the GP2 Team’s Championship in third with Fabio Leimer and Julián Leal behind the wheels of the Spanish team’s cars. The young Swiss Fabio Leimer was crowned 2013 GP2 Champion at the YAS Marina Circuit in Abu Dhabi, while his teammate Julián Leal finished the season as 12th in the overall standings.

In 2014, the team signed Stefano Coletti and Ferrari junior Raffaele Marciello as their drivers for the 2014 season. The team achieved three victories and finished fourth in the teams' championship, with Coletti finishing 6th and Marciello 8th in the drivers' championship.

For 2015, Racing Engineering signed Jordan King as one of their drivers. On February 27, the team confirmed Alexander Rossi for a drive in the 2015 season. The team finished second in the standings with Rossi scoring three wins and finishing runner-up.

The team retained King for the 2016 season whilst signing Norman Nato and retained second in the championship with four wins from the pair.

For the 2017 season, Nyck de Vries and Gustav Malja were signed to the team.

The 2018 season sees the Spanish team compete in the European Le Mans Series, which means a return to endurance racing for Racing Engineering. The team will compete with an LMP2 car.

For the 2019 season, Racing Engineering will compete in the NASCAR Whelen Euro Series. Three-time Euro Series champion Ander Vilariño, who won the Spanish Formula Three championship with the team in 2001, returns to the team to compete in the No. 48 Ford Mustang in the Elite 1 class. He will be partnered by 2018 NASCAR Camping World Truck Series Rookie of the Year Myatt Snider in the Elite 2 class. The team would also field Romain Iannetta and Eric Clément in the No. 88 Ford Mustang in the Elite 1 and Elite 2 class respectively.

Results

NASCAR Whelen Euro Series – Elite 1

 Season still in progress.

NASCAR Whelen Euro Series – Elite 2

 Season still in progress.

European Le Mans Series

FIA Formula 2 Championship

† Delétraz and De Vries exchanged their seats at Racing Engineering and Rapax, respectively.

GP2 Series

† Tung also competed in 14 races for DAMS in 2010.
‡ Parente also competed in 8 races for Carlin in 2011.

World Series by Nissan

Spanish Formula 3

Reference: GP2 and Formula 3000 entrylist and complete results

Results in detail

GP2 Series 
(key) (Races in bold indicate pole position) (Races in italics indicate fastest lap)

GP2 Asia Series

FIA Formula 2 Championship

Timeline

References

External links
 Official website
 GP2 Series Official website

Spanish auto racing teams
GP2 Series teams
Euroformula Open Championship teams
Auto racing teams established in 1999
1999 establishments in Spain
FIA Formula 2 Championship teams
NASCAR teams
European Le Mans Series teams
24 Hours of Le Mans teams